Don't Be A Stranger was an album by Preston Reed, his only release on FolkStudio Records and available in Italy only. It subsequently went out-of-print.

Track listing
(All songs by Preston Reed)
 "Bye Bye Boo Boo"
 "Elephant Walk"
 "Kristy"
 "Du Vin Fou"
 "Last Scene in September"
 "False Spring"
 "Southern Exposure"
 "Don't Be A Stranger"
 "No More Spaghetti (Basta Pasta)"

Personnel
Preston Reed - 6 & 12-string acoustic guitars

References

1982 albums
Preston Reed albums